Bernard J. Rosenthal (August 9, 1914 – July 28, 2009), also known as Tony Rosenthal, was an American abstract sculptor widely known for his monumental public art sculptures, created over seven decades.

Biography

Rosenthal was born August 9, 1914 in Highland Park, Illinois, a suburb of Chicago.

He received his Bachelor of Fine Arts degree at the University of Michigan in 1936.

Career
Rosenthal received his first public art commission when he created "A Nubian Slave" for the Elgin Watch Company building at the 1939 World's Fair.

Although Rosenthal's public art, included five works in Manhattan, and numerous similar works in Los Angeles, Philadelphia, Florida, Michigan, Connecticut, the artist remained elusive. Art dealer Joseph K. Levene told The New York Times He reminds me of a character actor. You know the face but not the name. With him, you know the art.  By the time of his death at 94, he had not had a retrospective of his work.

Rosenthal's works are owned by museums around the world, including: Chrysler Museum: "Big Six", 1977; Connecticut College: "Memorial Cube", 1972; Israel Museum: "Oracle", 1960; Long House Reserve: "Mandala", 1994–95, "Rites of Spring", 1997; Los Angeles County Museum of Art: "Things Invisible to See", 1960, "Harp Player", 1950; Milwaukee Art Museum: "Big Six", 1977, "Maquette for Hammarskjold", 1977; National Gallery of Art: "Magpole", 1965; San Diego Museum of Art: "Odyssey", 1974; "Cumuli III", 1965 Risd Museum.

Public art
Tony Rosenthal was best known for his large outdoor geometric abstract sculptures.  Rosenthal's work includes:

 The Family Group, Parker Center, Los Angeles, 1955.
 Orion, Fulton Mall, Fresno, 1964.
 Duologue, Governor Nelson A. Rockefeller Empire State Plaza Art Collection Albany, New York 1965
 Alamo, Astor Place, New York City, 1967. This "established Rosenthal as a master of monumental public sculpture, and something of a standard bearer of the contemporary structurist esthetic." He stated: "It is…important the sculpture interact with the public."
The Cube "Endover", The University of Michigan, Ann Arbor, Michigan, 1968. Gift from the University of Michigan class of 1965 and Rosenthal, an alumnus of the university (Class of 1936) 
 Odyssey III, San Diego Museum of Art, California, 1973
 5 in 1, Lower Manhattan, New York City, 1973–74
 Indiana Totem , 1989, Circle , 1987, J.S. Bach Fugure , 1991, Indiana University Art Museum , Bloomington, Indiana

 Hammarskjold, 1977, Brooklyn College, Brooklyn, New York (formerly located at the Fashion Institute of Technology)

References

 Hunter, Sam, Tony Rosenthal, Rizzoli International Publications, Incorporated, 2001, 
 Wight, Frederick S., Bernard Rosenthal, New York: Catherine Viviano, 1958.
 Marika Herskovic, American Abstract Expressionism of the 1950s An Illustrated Survey, (New York School Press, 2003.) . pp. 290–293
 http://www.27east.com/story_detail.cfm?id=226187
 http://www.easthamptonstar.com/dnn/Archive/Home20090806/Obituaries/tabid/9613/Default.aspx

External links
 

1914 births
2009 deaths
20th-century American sculptors
20th-century American male artists
American male sculptors
Cranbrook Academy of Art alumni
Modern sculptors
University of Michigan alumni